Centaurus II is a cruising catamaran designed by E.N. Maryanov in 1994.

See also
 List of multihulls

References

Trimarans